Ignas Aloyce Malocha (born 22 December 1960) is a Tanzanian CCM politician and Member of Parliament for Kwela constituency since 2010.

References

1960 births
Living people
Chama Cha Mapinduzi MPs
Tanzanian MPs 2010–2015
Iyunga Secondary School alumni